Şəfəqli is a village and the most populous municipality, except for the capital Yardımlı, in the Yardymli Rayon of Azerbaijan.  It has a population of 1,865.  The municipality consists of the villages of Şəfəqli, Ciribul, and Gilar.

Notable natives 

 Jamil Niftaliyev — National Hero of Azerbaijan.

References 

Populated places in Yardimli District